The Elect'Road is a plug-in series hybrid version of Renault's popular Kangoo. Sales began in Europe in 2003, mainly in France, Norway and a few in the UK. The Elect'Road was sold alongside Renault's Electri'cité electric-drive Kangoo battery electric van. Renault discontinued the Elect'Road after selling about 500, primarily in France, Norway and the UK, for about €25,000.

The Elect'Road had a  range using a nickel-cadmium battery pack and a  liquid-cooled gasoline Lombardini LGW523 MPI "range-extender" engine.

Although the Elect'road had a range extender it is effectively the very first plug-in hybrid electric vehicle (PHEV). In hybrid terms it operates in a blended mode, using engine and battery power simultaneously.

Passenger compartment heat is powered by the battery pack as well as an auxiliary coolant circuit that is heated by the range extender engine.

Motor
The synchronous motor does not require brush replacement (e.g. as in the Citroën Berlingo Electrique) and therefore reduces required maintenance.

Batteries
The battery consists of two cases underneath the chassis, one with 8 monoblocks and the other with 14. Each is fitted with a fan cooling system and has a minimum 100 A·h capacity. The  battery provides 132 V and 13.2 kWh.

The onboard 3.5-kilowatt charger could charge a depleted battery pack to 95% charge in about four hours from 220 volts.

The battery life is guaranteed for 5 years (1500 cycles) and the cost to replace them if needed was 7000EUR

Range extender
The range extender is a Lombardini (LGW 523 mpi) liquid cooled    gasoline generator. The operating speed of the internal combustion engine—and therefore the output delivered by the generators—varied according to demand.

It is equipped with a multipoint injection system and catalytic converter (consistent with the rules of euro 2000 in the MVEG cycle).

The range extender function is activated by a switch on the dashboard.

The Elect'road also offers a “boost” mode which provides better acceleration, by increasing the maximum power from 22 to 29 kW, together with a “snow” mode which is better adapted to driving on low-grip surfaces.

When the RE engine is run all the time, the fuel economy drops to 7 liters/100 km (39 miles per imperial gallon). However, a user has found that they only needed to use it 10% of the time in which case economy improves to 3 liters/100 km (91 miles per imperial gallon).

Summary of Features
Battery
Air cooled nickel-cadmium battery batteries, guaranteed for 5 years (1500 cycles)
Charging time:
0 to 95% in 4 hours using internal 3.5 kW charger from a 220 V supply for 15 A circuits
2 kW charge mode is available for 10 A circuits
Range Extender:
Fuel tank capacity: 10 l
Output
Normal Mode: 10 kW
Boost Mode: 22 to 29 kW
Range/max-speed:
Electric Mode:  easily / 
Petrol Only: ? km/
Electric & petrol Mode: 150–200 km (90–120 mi)/
Driving Experience
Mains cabin preheat during winter (when plugged in)
Automatic creep (remove your foot from the brake and the van will start to move forward)
Warning light comes on at 10 percent state of charge

References 

Electroad
Mini MPVs
Hybrid electric vehicles
Front-wheel-drive vehicles
2000s cars